"Pax Soprana" is the sixth episode of the HBO original series The Sopranos. It was written by Frank Renzulli, directed by Alan Taylor and originally aired on February 14, 1999.

Starring
 James Gandolfini as Tony Soprano
 Lorraine Bracco as Dr. Jennifer Melfi
 Edie Falco as Carmela Soprano
 Michael Imperioli as Christopher Moltisanti
 Dominic Chianese as Corrado Soprano, Jr.
 Vincent Pastore as Pussy Bonpensiero
 Steven Van Zandt as Silvio Dante *
 Tony Sirico as Paulie Gualtieri *
 Robert Iler as Anthony Soprano, Jr. *
 Jamie-Lynn Sigler as Meadow Soprano *
 Nancy Marchand as Livia Soprano

* = credit only

Guest starring
 John Heard as Vin Makazian
 Jerry Adler as Hesh Rabkin

Also guest starring

Synopsis
Mikey Palmice beats up the leader of a card game that had been protected by Jimmy Altieri. Mikey says "Junior Soprano is the new boss. And he ain't respecting old arrangements."  While Junior is being fitted for a new suit, his tailor tells him that his 14-year-old grandson committed suicide after taking drugs sold to him by Rusty Irish. Rusty is Larry Boy Barese's top earner, but Junior has him killed.

Prompted by Livia, Junior tells Hesh that he must now, for the first time, make payments to him. Hesh goes to Tony, who goes to Johnny Sack, the underboss in New York's Lupertazzi crime family. They negotiate with Junior, who reduces his demands, and Hesh agrees to pay. Junior's capos are resentful because he is keeping too much money for himself. Tony speaks to Junior, who agrees to pass Hesh's tribute money down to his capos. Tony gives his share of this money back to Hesh.

Tony loses his libido as a side effect of his medication. Carmela becomes very discontented; so does his mistress, Irina. He starts having erotic dreams about Dr. Melfi and believes he is in love with her. In a session with her, Tony tries to kiss her. He has her aging car stolen and then returned with a new starter. Carmela admits to Tony that she is jealous that his therapist can help him and she cannot. Tony tells her that she is his life, and they reconcile.

Junior celebrates his promotion with a banquet. A waiter has a button camera and takes photos for the FBI.

First appearance
 John "Johnny Sack" Sacrimoni:  The underboss of the Lupertazzi crime family, one of the Five Families of New York City.

Deceased
 Rusty Irish: murdered by Mikey Palmice with help of Joseph Marino on orders from Uncle Junior.

Title reference
The title is a reference to Pax Romana (Roman peace) and related terms (Pax Britannica, Pax Americana, etc.), which refer to a lack of conflict over a long period of time due to the unchallenged rule of a single dominant power, which Tony hopes to achieve within the Soprano family. Pax Romana was an era initiated by the Roman emperor Augustus, mentioned by Tony in his conversation with Uncle Junior.

Cultural references
 Tony speaks to Junior about Octavian, later the Roman Emperor Augustus.
 Livia alludes to Rudyard Kipling's poem Gunga Din. He was a servant who carried water to soldiers in need.
In the episode's final scene, sitting to Tony Soprano's left in the banquet hall is real-life Gambino crime family associate Anthony Corozzo, brother of Gambino capo Nicholas Corozzo and former Gambino consigliere, Joseph Corozzo.

Music
 The song played when Mikey and his boys shake down a poker game that is under Jimmy Altieri's protection is "Willy Nilly" by Rufus Thomas. 
 The song played when Mr. Capri fits Junior for a new suit is "When the Boy in Your Arms" by Connie Francis. 
 While Junior visits Livia at Green Grove, some of the other seniors are singing to "I Whistle a Happy Tune".
 The song played as Christopher walks into the card game at Satriale's is "Coconut Boogaloo," by Medeski Martin & Wood.
 The song played during Tony's first dream featuring Dr. Melfi is "What Time Is It?" by The Jive Five.
 The song played when Tony meets with Johnny Sack during his anniversary dinner with Carmela is "Pampa" by Gustavo Santaolalla. 
 The song played during the final montage and end credits is an instrumental version of "Paparazzi" by Xzibit, a song derived from Gabriel Fauré's "Pavane".

Filming locations 
Listed in order of first appearance:

 Harrison, New Jersey
 West Orange, New Jersey
 Satriale's Pork Store in Kearny, New Jersey
 West Caldwell, New Jersey
 Paterson, New Jersey
 The Great Falls in Paterson, New Jersey
 Long Island City, Queens
 Glen Head, New York

Reception
In 2015, Alan Sepinwall argued that "Pax Soprana" is "so fraught with discomfort and complications with both family and Family (and whatever separate sphere Melfi occupies) that it's nearly as compelling in its own right as last week's Very Special Episode." Emily St. James of The A.V. Club wrote that the episode "isn't a tremendous hour of television like 'College' was, but it may be more significant."

References

External links
"Pax Soprana"  at HBO

The Sopranos (season 1) episodes
1999 American television episodes

fr:Pax Soprana